The 1990–91 Florida State Seminoles men's basketball team represented Florida State University in the program's final season as members of the Metro Conference during the 1990–91 NCAA Division I men's basketball season. Led by head coach Pat Kennedy, the Seminoles reached the second round of the NCAA tournament. The team finished with an overall record of 21–11 (9–5 Metro).

Roster

Schedule

|-
!colspan=9 style=| Regular season
|-

|-
!colspan=9 style=| Metro Conference tournament
|-

|-
!colspan=9 style=| NCAA Tournament
|-

References

Florida State Seminoles men's basketball seasons
1990 in sports in Florida
1991 in sports in Florida
Florida State
Florida State